Evan Mercer is a Canadian actor. He is most noted for his performance in the 2016 film Riverhead, for which he garnered a Canadian Screen Award nomination for Best Supporting Actor at the 5th Canadian Screen Awards.

Originally from the community of Shearstown in Bay Roberts, Newfoundland and Labrador, Mercer has acted primarily on stage. He has also been a guest actor on the television series Republic of Doyle.

References

External links

Canadian male film actors
Canadian male stage actors
Canadian male television actors
Male actors from Newfoundland and Labrador
Living people
People from Bay Roberts
Year of birth missing (living people)